Amin El-Hady (also Amin El-Hady, ; born April 13, 1983) is an Egyptian judoka, who played for the half-lightweight category. He is a two-time Olympian and a five-time medalist (three gold and two silver) at the African Judo Championships. He also captured a silver medal for his division at the 2007 All-Africa Games in Algiers, Algeria, losing out to the host nation's Mounir Benamadi.

El-Hady made his official debut for the 2004 Summer Olympics in Athens, where he lost the first preliminary round match of men's half-lightweight class (66 kg), by an ippon and a sumi gaeshi, to Algeria's Amar Meridja.

At the 2008 Summer Olympics in Beijing, El-Hady competed for the second time in the men's half-lightweight class (66 kg). He first defeated Armenia's Armen Nazaryan in the first preliminary round, before losing out his next match by a single koka and an ōuchi gari to Cuba's Yordanis Arencibia. Because his opponent advanced further into the semi-finals, El-Hady offered another shot for the bronze medal by defeating Andorra's Daniel García González and United States' Taylor Takata in the repechage rounds. He finished only in seventh place, after losing out the final repechage bout to Uzbekistan's Mirali Sharipov, who successfully scored a waza-ari (half-point) and a tomoe nage (circle throw), at the end of the five-minute period.

References

External links

NBC Olympics Profile

1983 births
Living people
Egyptian male judoka
Olympic judoka of Egypt
Judoka at the 2004 Summer Olympics
Judoka at the 2008 Summer Olympics
People from Sharqia Governorate
African Games silver medalists for Egypt
African Games medalists in judo
Mediterranean Games bronze medalists for Egypt
Mediterranean Games medalists in judo
Competitors at the 2007 All-Africa Games
Competitors at the 2005 Mediterranean Games
20th-century Egyptian people
21st-century Egyptian people